Merrilyn Goos is an Australian mathematics educator. Since October 2017 she has been Professor of STEM Education and Director of EPI*STEM at the University of Limerick, Ireland.

From 2012-2017 Goos was professor and head of the School of Education at the University of Queensland, and prior to this was Director of the Teaching and Educational Development Institute at The University of Queensland. She has taught in mathematics education and in 2003 she received the university's Award for Excellence in Teaching.

Qualifications
Goos has Associate and Licentiate Teachers Diplomas in Speech and Drama from Trinity College London, a B.Sc., Diploma, Master's degree in educational studies, and Ph.D. from the University of Queensland, and a Graduate Diploma in Reading from  Griffith University.

Professional associations
Goos was president of the Mathematics Education Research Group of Australasia, past vice-president of the Queensland Association of Mathematics Teachers, and past chair of the Queensland Studies Authority's Mathematics Syllabus Advisory Committee.

In 2004 she won an Office for Learning and Teaching teaching award for her work as a mathematics teacher educator, and in 2006 was awarded national fellowships to investigate assessment leadership in higher education institutions.

References

Australian women scientists
Living people
Year of birth missing (living people)
20th-century Australian mathematicians
21st-century Australian mathematicians
Australian women mathematicians
University of Queensland alumni
20th-century women mathematicians
21st-century women mathematicians
Educational Studies in Mathematics editors
20th-century Australian women